Issiar Dramé (born 16 February 1999) is a French professional footballer who plays as a centre-back for  club Bastia.

Career
Born in Ivry-sur-Seine, Dramé began his career at the famed Clairefontaine academy before joining the youth side at Rennes in 2015. After spending a season with Rennais, Dramé moved to the youth side at Lyon. In 2017, he was promoted to the club's reserve side, making his Championnat National 2 debut on 18 February 2017 in a 1–1 draw against Andrézieux.

In 2020, in search of first team football, Dramé trialed at Norwegian club SK Brann and Austrian Bundesliga club Sturm Graz but did not sign with either side.

Olimpik Donetsk
In October 2020, Dramé joined Ukrainian Premier League club Olimpik Donetsk. He made his debut on 24 October 2020 against Desna Chernihiv, starting in the 2–0 home defeat. Dramé played in 18 matches for Olimpik Donetsk as the club were relegated to the First League.

New York Red Bulls
On 29 September 2021, Dramé signed with MLS side New York Red Bulls. Following the 2021 season, New York declined their contract option on Dramé.

Bastia 
On 1 September 2022, Dramé signed for Ligue 2 club Bastia on a three-year contract.

International career
Born in France, is of Malian descent. He was called up to the Mali national team for 2023 Africa Cup of Nations qualification matches in March 2023.

Career statistics

References

1999 births
Living people
Sportspeople from Ivry-sur-Seine
French footballers
French sportspeople of Malian descent
Association football defenders
FC Olimpik Donetsk players
FC Lviv players
Championnat National 2 players
Ukrainian Premier League players
French expatriate footballers
French expatriate sportspeople in Ukraine
French expatriate sportspeople in the United States
Expatriate footballers in Ukraine
Expatriate soccer players in the United States
Black French sportspeople
New York Red Bulls players
New York Red Bulls II players
USL Championship players
SC Bastia players
Ligue 2 players